is a village located in Nagano Prefecture, Japan. , the village had an estimated population of 414 in 192 households, and a population density of 5.4 persons per km².

Geography
Hiraya is located in mountainous southwestern Nagano Prefecture, surrounded by 1500 meter mountains, and bordered by Gifu Prefecture to the west. Hiraya is at an average altitude of 900 meters, and contains Mount Ōkawairi and the source of the Yahagi River.

Surrounding municipalities
Nagano Prefecture
 Achi
 Urugi
 Anan
 Neba
Gifu Prefecture
Nakatsugawa
Ena

Climate
The village has a climate characterized by hot and humid summers, and cold winters (Köppen climate classification Cfb).  The average annual temperature in Hiraya is 9.8 °C. The average annual rainfall is 2106 mm with September as the wettest month. The temperatures are highest on average in August, at around 21.8 °C, and lowest in January, at around -2.1 °C.

Demographics 
Per Japanese census data, the population of Hiraya has declined by more than two-thirds over the past 80 years.

History
The area of present-day Hiraya was part of ancient Shinano Province. The village of Namiai was established on April 1, 1889 by the establishment of the modern municipalities system. A portion of Namiai separated to become the village of Hiraya on April 1, 2006.

Economy
The economy of Hiraya is based on tourism to its ski and hot spring resorts.

Education
Hiraya has one public elementary school operated by the village government and one public middle school shared with the neighbouring village of Achi. The village does not have a high school.

Transportation

Railway
The village has no passenger railway service.

Highway

References

External links

Official Website 

 
Villages in Nagano Prefecture